The Budișteanca is a left tributary of the river Argeș in Romania. It discharges into the Argeș near Leordeni. It flows through the villages Bujoi, Bârloi, Bogați, Chițești, Schitu Scoicești, Budișteni and Ciulnița.

References

Rivers of Romania
Rivers of Argeș County